Arline Hunter (born Arlene J. Hunter; December 16, 1931 – September 11, 2018) was an American actress and model. She was perhaps best known as Playboy's Playmate of the Month for August 1954. Her centerfold was the first not to be purchased from the John Baumgarth Co. by Hugh Hefner, and was instead photographed by Ed DeLong, who went on to become one of the more prolific Playboy photographers in the 1960s.

Career
Much of Hunter's fame was built upon her resemblance to Marilyn Monroe; indeed, her Playboy pose was obviously inspired by Monroe's notorious 1949 nude photo session with Tom Kelley from which her own Playboy photo came. The similarity in look between Hunter and Monroe also came into play when a nude Hunter starred in a stag film called, The Apple-Knockers and the Coke. For many years there have been those who have seen the film and have mistaken Hunter for Monroe.

Hunter went on to have a film career that consisted mostly of sexy parts in B-movies such as White Lightnin' Road and The Art of Burlesque. She also appeared alongside the Three Stooges in 1957's Outer Space Jitters. She appeared as a dancer in Sex Kittens Go to College, which starred fellow bombshell Mamie Van Doren. She also had guest roles in prominent television series such as Perry Mason and My Three Sons, and appeared in a 1962 episode of Straightaway.

Hunter was married to Prussian-born Wolfgang Wergin until his death in February 2006. Hunter died in San Pedro, California on 11 September 2018, at the age of 86.

Filmography

Films
 The Apple-Knockers and the Coke (1948)
 The Art of Burlesque (1950) as Betty
 Baghdad After Midnight (1954) (credited as Arlene Hunter)
 Casanova's Big Night (1954) (uncredited) as Girl in window
 Son of Sinbad (1955) (as Arlene Hunter) as Tartar Girl
 Outer Space Jitters (1957) (uncredited) as Sunev Girl
 Revolt in the Big House (1958) as Girl
 The Angry Red Planet (1960) as Joan
 Sex Kittens Go to College (1960) as Nurse
 The Ruined Bruin (1961)
 White Lightnin' Road (1965) as Ruby
 Don't Worry, We'll Think of a Title (1966) as Girl Student
 Big Daddy (1969)

Television
 Perry Mason - "The Case of the Fraudulent Photo" (1959) as Receptionist
 Tales of Wells Fargo - "The Jackass" (1959) as Saloon Girl
 Johnny Staccato - "Swinging Long Hair" (1960) as Photographer
 The Jim Backus Show - "Floundered in Florida" (1961) (credited as Arlene Hunter) as Angela
 My Three Sons - "Robbie and the Chorus Girl" (1965) as Beauty

See also
 List of people in Playboy 1953–59

References

External links

1931 births
2018 deaths
1950s Playboy Playmates
People from Caldwell, Idaho